

Men's 100 m Butterfly - Final

Men's 100 m Butterfly - Semifinals

Men's 100 m Butterfly - Semifinal 01

Men's 100 m Butterfly - Semifinal 01

Men's 100 m Butterfly - Heats

Men's 100 m Butterfly - Heat 01

Men's 100 m Butterfly - Heat 02

Men's 100 m Butterfly - Heat 03

Men's 100 m Butterfly - Heat 04

References

Swimming at the 2006 Commonwealth Games